UDF 2457 is the Hubble Ultra Deep Field (UDF) identifier for a red dwarf star calculated to be about  from Earth with a very dim apparent magnitude of 25.

The Milky Way galaxy is about 100,000 light-years in diameter, and the Sun is about 25,000 light-years from the Galactic Center. The small common star UDF 2457 may be one of the farthest known stars inside the main body of the Milky Way. Globular clusters (such as Messier 54 and NGC 2419) and stellar streams are located farther out in the galactic halo.

See also 
UDFj-39546284 – farthest galaxy seen by the Hubble Ultra Deep Field

References 

Fornax (constellation)
M-type main-sequence stars
Hubble Space Telescope
02457